The Squaliformes  are an order of sharks that includes about 126 species in seven families.

Members of the order have two dorsal fins, which usually possess spines, they usually have a sharp head,  no anal fin or nictitating membrane, and five to seven gill slits. In most other respects, however, they are quite variable in form and size. Most species of the squaliform order live in saltwater or brackish water. They are found worldwide, from northern to tropical waters, and from shallow coastal seas to the open ocean.

All members of the family Eptomeridae and Dalatiidae and Zameus squamulosus possess photophores, luminous organs, and exhibit intrinsic bioluminescence. Bioluminescence evolved once in Squaliformes, approximately 111–153 million years ago, and helped the Squaliformes radiate and adapt to the deep sea. The common ancestor of Dalatiidae, Etmopteridae, Somniosidae, and Oxynotidae possessed a luminous organ and used bioluminescence for camouflage by counterillumination. Counterillumination is an active form of camouflage in which an organism emits light to match the intensity of downwelling light to hide from predators below. Currently, bioluminescence provides different functions for Squaliformes based on the family. Dalatiidae and Zameus squamulosus possess simple photophores and use bioluminescence for ventral counter-illumination. Etmopteridae possess more complex photophores  and utilize bioluminescence for ventral counter illumination as well as species recognition.

Classification
Family Centrophoridae Bleeker, 1859 (gulper sharks)
 Genus Centrophorus
 Genus Deania

Family Dalatiidae (J. E. Gray, 1851) (kitefin sharks)
 Genus Euprotomicroides
 Genus Heteroscymnoides
 Genus Mollisquama
 Genus Dalatias
 Genus Isistius
 Genus Euprotomicrus
 Genus Squaliolus

Family Echinorhinidae Theodore Gill, 1862 (bramble sharks)
 Genus Echinorhinus

Family Etmopteridae Fowler, 1934 (lantern sharks)
 Genus Aculeola
 Genus Centroscyllium
 Genus Etmopterus
 Genus Trigonognathus

Family Oxynotidae Gill, 1872 (rough sharks)
 Genus Oxynotus

Family Somniosidae D. S. Jordan, 1888 (sleeper sharks)
 Genus Centroscymnus
 Genus Centroselachus
 Genus Scymnodalatias
 Genus Scymnodon
 Genus Somniosus
 Genus Zameus

Family Squalidae Blainville, 1816 (dogfish sharks)
 Genus Cirrhigaleus
 Genus Squalus

References

Further reading

 
Extant Late Jurassic first appearances
Taxa named by Edwin Stephen Goodrich
Cartilaginous fish orders